In the mathematical field of analysis, a well-known theorem describes the set of discontinuities of a monotone real-valued function of a real variable; all discontinuities of such a (monotone) function are necessarily jump discontinuities and there are at most countably many of them.

Usually, this theorem appears in literature without a name. It is called Froda's theorem in some recent works; in his 1929 dissertation, Alexandru Froda stated that the result was previously well-known and had provided his own elementary proof for the sake of convenience. Prior work on discontinuities had already been discussed in the 1875 memoir of the French mathematician Jean Gaston Darboux.

Definitions 

Denote the limit from the left by

and denote the limit from the right by

Consider a real-valued function  of real variable  defined in a neighborhood of a point  If  is discontinuous at the point  then the discontinuity will be a removable discontinuity, or an essential discontinuity, or a jump discontinuity (also called a discontinuity of the first kind).
Moreover, if  is not continuous at  the jump can be zero at  if

Precise statement 

Let  be a real-valued monotone function defined on an interval  Then the set of discontinuities of the first kind is at most countable.

One can prove that all points of discontinuity of a monotone real-valued function defined on an interval are jump discontinuities and hence, by our definition, of the first kind. With this remark the theorem takes the stronger form:

Let  be a monotone function defined on an interval  Then the set of discontinuities is at most countable.

Proofs 

This proof starts by proving the special case where the function's domain is a closed and bounded interval  The proof of the general case follows from this special case.

Proof when the domain is closed and bounded 

Two proofs of this special case are given.

Proof 1 

Let  be an interval and let  be a non-decreasing function (such as an increasing function).
Then for any 

For any   so that 
Consequently,

and hence 

Define the following sets:

Each set  is finite or the empty set. The union
 contains all points at which the jump is positive and hence contains all points of discontinuity. Since every  is at most countable, their union  is also at most countable.

If  is non-increasing (or decreasing) then the proof is similar. This completes the proof of the special case where the function's domain is a closed and bounded interval.

Proof 2 

It will now be shown that if  are distinct, say with  then 
If  then  implies  so that 
If on the other hand  then  implies  so that 
Either way, 

Since  is countable, the same must be true of

Proof of general case 

In particular, because every interval (including open intervals and half open/closed intervals) of real numbers can be written as a countable union of closed and bounded intervals, it follows that any monotone real-valued function defined on an interval has at most countable many discontinuities.

Then the interval can be written as a countable union of closed and bounded intervals  with the property that any two consecutive intervals have an endpoint in common: 
If  then  where  is a strictly decreasing sequence such that  In a similar way if  or if 
In any interval  there are at most countable many points of discontinuity, and since a countable union of at most countable sets is at most countable, it follows that the set of all discontinuities is at most countable.

Jump functions 
Examples. Let 1 < 2 < 3 < ⋅⋅⋅ be a countable subset of the compact interval [,] and let μ1, μ2, μ3, ... be a positive sequence with finite sum. Set

where χA denotes the characteristic function of a compact interval . In the case of finitely many jump discontinuities,  is a step function. The examples above are generalised step functions; they are very special cases of what are called jump functions or saltus-functions.

More generally, the analysis of monotone functions has been studied by many mathematicians, starting from Abel, Jordan and Darboux. Following , replacing a function by its negative if necessary, only the case of non-negative non-decreasing functions has to be considered. The domain [,] can be finite or have ∞ or −∞ as endpoints.

The main task is to construct monotone functions — generalising step functions — with discontinuities at a given denumerable set of points and with prescribed left and right discontinuities at each of these points.
Define

Then the jump function, or saltus-function, defined by

Passing to the limit, it follows that

 and  

if  is not one of the 's.

Conversely, by a differentiation theorem of Lebesgue, the jump function  is uniquely determined by the properties: (1) being non-decreasing and non-positive; (2) having given jump data at its points of discontinuity ; (3) satisfying the boundary condition = 0; and (4) having zero derivative almost everywhere.

Recall that a null set  is a subset such that, for any arbitrarily small ε' > 0, there is an open  containing  with ℓ() < ε'. It implies immediately that the union of two null sets is null; and that a finite or countable set is null.

Proposition 1. For  > 0 and a normalised non-negative jump function , let be the set of points  such that 

Then
() is open and has total length ℓ(()) ≤ 4 –1 (() –).

On the other hand, it is elementary that, if three fixed bounded open intervals have a common point of intersection, then their union contains one of the three intervals: indeed just take the supremum and infimum points to identify the endpoints. As a result, the finite cover can be taken as adjacent open intervals,, ... only intersecting at consecutive intervals. Hence

Proposition 2. If  is a jump function, then  '() = 0 almost everywhere.

To prove this, define 

It will suffice to prove that for any fixed  > 0, the Dini derivative satisfies ≤  almost everywhere, i.e. on a null set. 

Choose ε > 0, arbitrarily small. Starting from the definition of the jump function  = Σ , write  =  +  with  = Σ≤  and  = Σ>  where  ≥ 1.

Thus  ≤  almost everywhere. Since  could be taken arbitrarily small,  and hence also  ' must vanish almost everywhere.

See also 
 
 
 Monotone function

Notes

References

Bibliography 
 
 
  (subscription required)

 ; reprinted by Dover, 2003
 
 
 
  
 
 
 
  Reprint of the 1955 original.
 
 
 
 
 

Articles containing proofs
Theory of continuous functions
Theorems in real analysis